Retinia cristata is a moth of the family Tortricidae. It is found in Japan (the islands of Hokkaido, Honshu, Shikoku, and Ryukyu), Korea, northern and central China (Beijing, Tianjin, Hebei, Shanxi, Liaoning, Heilongjiang, Jiangsu, Zhejiang, Anhui, Jiangxi, Shandong, Henan, Hubei, Hunan, Guangdong, Guangxi, Sichuan, Yunnan, Shaanxi), Taiwan and Thailand.

The wingspan is 12–17 mm. Adults are on wing from mid-May and mid-September on Honshu. On Shikoku, adults were recorded in July and early August and on Kyushu in September and October.

The larvae feed on shoots and cones of Pinus thurnbergii, Pinus densiflora and Pinus massoniana. The larvae can cause severe damage to young planted trees.

References

External links
Eurasian Tortricidae

Eucosmini
Moths of Japan
Moths described in 1900
Taxa named by Thomas de Grey, 6th Baron Walsingham